Fother Royd Wood is a woodland in Lancashire, England, near Worsthorne. It is owned and managed by the Woodland Trust.

References

Forests and woodlands of Lancashire
Geography of Burnley